Ha Hyun-yong (born ) is a South Korean male volleyball player. He currently plays for the Uijeongbu KB Insurance Stars.

Career

Clubs
Ha was selected ninth overall by the LIG Greaters in the 2005 V-League Draft, and won the Rookie of the Year Award after the league's inaugural season.

National team
As a junior at Kyonggi University in 2003, Ha was a member of the team which won the gold medal in the 2003 Summer Universiade defeating Japan in final. He also won the bronze medal at the 2010 Asian Games held in Guangzhou, as part of the South Korean national team.

Ha had consistently participated in the FIVB World League after his debut in 2006 and made his fifth appearance in the tournament in 2014.

References

External links
 profile at FIVB.org

1982 births
Living people
South Korean men's volleyball players
Place of birth missing (living people)
Asian Games medalists in volleyball
Volleyball players at the 2010 Asian Games
Medalists at the 2010 Asian Games
Asian Games bronze medalists for South Korea
Universiade medalists in volleyball
Universiade gold medalists for South Korea
21st-century South Korean people